Jomsviking is the tenth studio album from Swedish melodic death metal band Amon Amarth.  It was mixed and produced by Andy Sneap and released on 25 March 2016 through Metal Blade Records and Sony Music.

Concept 
This is the band's first concept album. Vocalist Johan Hegg described the concept of the album:

Critical reception

Writing for Exclaim!, Renee Trotier wrote that "while longtime fans might be a bit thrown off by some of the more melodic traditional metal elements throughout Jomsviking, the music is well suited to both the concept's narrative and a natural evolution of Amon Amarth's more well known style."

Track listing

Credits 
Writing, performance and production credits are adapted from the album liner notes.

Personnel

Amon Amarth 
 Johan Hegg − vocals
 Olavi Mikkonen − lead guitar
 Johan Söderberg − rhythm guitar
 Ted Lundström − bass

Session musicians 
 Tobias Gustafsson − drums

Guest musicians 
 Doro Pesch − clean female vocals on "A Dream That Cannot Be"

Production 
 Andy Sneap – production, recording, mixing

Visual art 
 Tom Thiel − cover art
 Thomas Ewerhard − layout
 Niclas Mortensen – additional artwork
 John Lorenzi – additional artwork
 Sam Didier – additional artwork
 Christian Sloan Hall – additional artwork
 Adi Kalingga – additional artwork
 Thomas Ewerhard – additional artwork
 Garip Jensen − photos, digital editing

Studios 
 Backstage Productions, Derbyshire – recording, mixing

Charts

Weekly charts

Year-end charts

References

2016 albums
Amon Amarth albums
Concept albums
Metal Blade Records albums